Mariya Nikolayevna Yayna (Мария Николаевна Яйна, born 25 January 1982) is a Russian female water polo player. She was a member of the Russia women's national water polo team, playing as a driver. 

She was a part of the  team at the 2004 Summer Olympics. On club level she played for SKIF-CSP Izmailovo in Russia.

See also
 List of World Aquatics Championships medalists in water polo

References

External links
 

1982 births
Living people
Russian female water polo players
Water polo players at the 2004 Summer Olympics
Olympic water polo players of Russia
Sportspeople from Moscow
21st-century Russian women